Ülo Lumiste (30 June 1929 Vändra – 20 November 2017) was an Estonian mathematician.

In 1952 he graduated from the University of Tartu in mathematics. In 1968 he defended his doctoral thesis at Kazan University. Since 1959 he taught at the University of Tartu.

Since 1993 he was a member of Estonian Academy of Sciences.

His main field of research was differential geometry. In 1960s he established the school of Estonian differential geometry.

Awards
 1999 and 2012: Estonian State Science Prize
 1999: Order of the White Star, III class.

References

1929 births
2017 deaths
Estonian mathematicians
University of Tartu alumni
Academic staff of the University of Tartu
Recipients of the Order of the White Star, 3rd Class
People from Vändra